Albritton is a surname. Notable people with the surname include:

Alex Albritton (1892–1940), American baseball pitcher
Ben Albritton (born 1968), American politician from Florida
Dave Albritton (1913–1994), American high jumper and politician
Greg Albritton (born 1953), American politician from Alabama
Harold Albritton (born 1936), American judge
Rogers Albritton (1923–2002), American philosophy professor
Sidney Albritton (born 1971), American politician from Mississippi
Terry Albritton (1955–2005), American shot putter
Vince Albritton (born 1962), American football player